Hen Lippin (born November 4, 1965 in Beitan Aharon), the youngest of three brothers, is a retired Israeli basketball player.

Career
Lippin joined Maccabi Tel Aviv in 1984, and played at the club for six seasons, wearing number 10. He later played for Maccabi Rishon LeZion and Hapoel Galil Elyon.

References

1965 births
Living people
Hapoel Galil Elyon players
Israeli Basketball Premier League players
Israeli men's basketball players
Maccabi Rishon LeZion basketball players
Maccabi Tel Aviv B.C. players
Point guards
1986 FIBA World Championship players